Rachel Ashegbofe Ikemeh is a Nigerian conservationist who won a Whitley award in 2020. She is the director
of South West and Niger Delta Forest Project, a conservation program for endangered primates as the Nigeria-Cameroon chimpanzee, Red colobus monkey(Piliocolobus epieni) and Benin potto in the respective regions. She has actively been in Nigeria conservation for the past 15 years.

Ikemeh has been involved in the establishment of two protected areas in Nigeria: a IUCN category II PA in Ekiti State and a community conservation area in Bayelsa State, Niger Delta, Nigeria.

References

Alumni of the University of Kent
Ahmadu Bello University alumni
Nigerian biologists
Primatologists
Living people
Women conservationists

Year of birth missing (living people)